Momisis singularis is a species of beetle in the family Cerambycidae. It was described by Ritsema in 1888. It is known from Sumatra.

References

Astathini
Beetles described in 1888